The Roswell Recreation and Parks is a municipal department serving the city of Roswell, Georgia. It oversees eight public-use parks covering over 900 acres and sponsors over 25 athletic programs ranging from soccer, football, basketball, baseball, and swimming for all age groups. It has been recognized as one of the top civic recreation programs in the United States. The Roswell Recreations Department also works closely with local middle and high schools by providing practice fields.

Recognition and awards
Roswell's Recreation and Parks department has twice been awarded a silver medal by the National Recreation and Park Association (NRPA).  The Roswell Rec is one of only seven agencies in Georgia and 116 in the United States to be accredited by the Commission for Accreditation of Park and Recreation Agencies (CAPRA).

Events
Roswell Arts FestivalRoswell Remembers Memorial Day Celebration
Roswell Roots Festival
Roswell Youth Day Parade
Roswell Youth Lacrosse Invitational
Trolley Crawl

Park trails
Allenbrook Trail
Willeo Trail

Park units

Azalea Park
Big Creek Park
Don White Memorial Park
East Roswell Park
Garrard Landing Park
Grimes Bridge Park
Hembree Road Park
Leita Thompson Memorial Park
Old Mill Park
Riverside Park

Roswell Area Park
Sweet Apple Park
Waller Park
Waller Park Extension
Willeo Park

Major athletic programs

Fall programs
Performing Arts
Gymnastics

Youth Baseball
Youth Basketball
Youth Football
Youth Softball (Fast pitch and slow pitch)
Adult Basketball
Adult Baseball
Adult Softball

Spring programs
Performing Arts
Gymnastics
Youth Soccer
Youth Tennis
Youth Swimming
Teen League Basketball
Adult Soccer
Adult Tennis

Summer programs
Youth swim team (Roswell Rapids)
Youth dive team (Roswell Rapids)
Adult swim team

See also
 Roswell, Georgia
Chattahoochee River National Recreation Area

References

External links
Official Roswell Recreation and Parks site
Roswell Soccer Club site with youth, select and rec, and adult team info
Roswell Rapids summer swim team

Roswell, Georgia
Baseball venues in Georgia (U.S. state)
Protected areas of Fulton County, Georgia
Recreational fishing in the United States
Tourist attractions in Roswell, Georgia